The 1976 Eastern Michigan Hurons football team represented Eastern Michigan University in the 1976 NCAA Division I football season. In their first season under head coach Ed Chlebek, the Hurons compiled a 2–9 record (1–5 against conference opponents), finished in ninth place in the Mid-American Conference, and were outscored by their opponents, 355 to 132. The team's statistical leaders included Steve Raklovits with 954 passing yards, Bobby Windom with 824 rushing yards, and Carlos Henderson with 328 receiving yards.

Schedule

References

Eastern Michigan
Eastern Michigan Eagles football seasons
Eastern Michigan Hurons football